Serine/threonine-protein kinase LMTK1 (also known as Apoptosis-associated tyrosine kinase) is an enzyme that in humans is encoded by the (AATK) gene.

Structure and expression

The gene was identified in 1998. It is located on chromosome 17 (17q25.3) and is expressed in the pancreas, kidney, brain and lungs. The protein is composed of 1,207 amino acids.

Function 

The protein contains a tyrosine kinase domain at the N-terminal end and a proline-rich domain at the c-terminal end.  Studies of the mouse homologue have indicated that it may be necessary for the induction of growth arrest and/or apoptosis of myeloid precursor cells. It may also have a role in inducing differentiation in neuronal cells.
Its suppressive role on melanoma development has been reported recently.

AATK is thought to indirectly inhibit the SPAK/WNK4 activation of the Na-K-Cl cotransporter.

References

Further reading

External links 
 
 

Genes on human chromosome 17
Tyrosine kinase receptors